The UK Covid-19 Inquiry is an independent public inquiry into the British government's handling of the COVID-19 pandemic in the United Kingdom. Public hearings are expected to begin in 2023. Boris Johnson announced the inquiry on 12 May 2021, to start in Spring 2022. He said the date was chosen because of a possible winter surge in infections, but that preparatory work on the terms of reference would start earlier, as would choosing a chair. In December 2021, Heather Hallett, Baroness Hallett was announced as the chair of the inquiry.

The draft terms of the inquiry include the UK's preparedness for the pandemic, the use of lockdowns and other non-pharmaceutical interventions, pandemic management in hospitals and care homes, equipment procurement, and the financial support made available. It will cover the period up to and including the Inquiry being established on 28 June 2022, and England, Wales, Scotland and Northern Ireland.

There had been prior proposals to launch a public inquiry from senior doctors, The BMJ, government scientific advisers, and ethnic minority group leaders. These proposals included looking into lockdown tactics, the "test, track and trace" service, and deaths related to the COVID-19 pandemic in the United Kingdom.

Background

The British government has been accused of being too slow to introduce restrictions and lockdowns related to COVID-19. Epidemiologist John Edmunds, a member of the Scientific Advisory Group for Emergencies (SAGE), said that the UK went into lockdown too late and this "cost a lot of lives". The independent think-tank the Resolution Foundation said that delaying the winter lockdown caused up to 27,000 extra deaths in England and accused the government of a "huge mistake" which should be central to any public inquiry into the UK's handling of the pandemic.

Andrew Hayward, a professor of infectious disease epidemiology and inclusion health research who also sits on SAGE, told The Guardian: "Many would argue that much of this could have been avoided if different [or] earlier decisions had been made at various points in the pandemic. These decision-making processes therefore need to be scrutinised and I think they are only likely to become completely clear if people are compelled to give evidence."

Earlier calls for an inquiry
Covid-19 Bereaved Families for Justice were pressuring the government to launch a judge-led statutory public inquiry into the pandemic and the government's response to it, with a rapid review phase. The BMJ advocated for an inquiry in May 2020 to take place before a second wave.

Proposals for topics to address in the inquiry have included: the scientific advice given to ministers, the large death rate in the UK, the test, track and trace system, communication of infection control measures and implementation of lockdown measures, travel restrictions, attempts to redress the disproportionate impact of COVID-19 on ethnic minorities, as well as a review of the functioning of the National Health Service and its staff during the pandemic − including supplies of personal protective equipment, the transfer of patients from hospitals to care homes, risk assessments (including failures to respond to warnings in 2017's Exercise Cygnus, which reported that the UK was not prepared for a pandemic), isolation and staff testing – the functioning of 111 services, the centralisation of decision-making (including tensions between the government and regional mayors) and the role of austerity in decision-making.

The group has threatened legal action, and lawyers representing the group have informed ministers that they are planning to seek judicial review by the High Court of Justice. Lawyers representing the group have acted in major public inquiries including into the Hillsborough, Grenfell Tower and Manchester Arena disasters.

As well as Edmunds and Hayward, other medical professionals who supported an inquiry included: Chaand Nagpaul, Donna Kinnair, Paul Nurse, and leading medical think tank the King's Fund. Unions such as the TUC, Unison, GMB the British Medical Association, Royal College of Nursing and Royal College of Physicians were also in support. Equality activists supporting an inquiry included Zara Mohammed and Simon Woolley.

Political figures in support included Keir Starmer, Ed Davey, Bob Kerslake, and David Cameron. Justin Welby, the Archbishop of Canterbury, had also called for the start of an inquiry. The Institute for Government also supported inquiry calls.

In March 2021 polling, 47% of the British public supported an inquiry, with 35% neither supporting nor opposing or didn't know, and 18% opposed.

Inquiry 

Boris Johnson announced in May 2021 that an inquiry would take place, and start in spring 2022.

On 15 December 2021, Heather Hallett, Baroness Hallett was announced as the chair of the inquiry. Unlike other public inquiries, a statutory public inquiry has the power to subpoena people and take evidence under oath. The inquiry will be the biggest ever such undertaking by the UK government.

Draft terms of reference were announced on 11 March 2022. Issues covered included the UK's preparedness, the use of lockdowns and other non-pharmaceutical interventions, pandemic management in hospitals and care homes, equipment procurement, and the financial support made available.

Keir Starmer, the leader of the opposition, and Care Campaign for the Vulnerable criticised the decision to omit partygate from the terms. A former Children's Commissioner for England, Anne Longfield, called the lack of focus on children's experiences in lockdown a "shocking oversight".

Public consultation on the terms ran from 11 March until 7 April and received over 20,000 responses. Hallett has said she would consider these responses and present her revised recommendations to Johnson in May 2022. Final terms of reference were published on 28 June 2022, allowing the inquiry to formally commence. Hallett expects public hearings to begin in 2023. The first preliminary public hearing took place on 4 October 2022.

See also 
 Coronakommissionen
 Controversies regarding COVID-19 contracts in the United Kingdom

References

External links
 

 
2021 in the United Kingdom
United Kingdom responses to the COVID-19 pandemic
Government of the United Kingdom
Public inquiries in the United Kingdom
Judicial inquiries
2022 in the United Kingdom
2022 in British politics
Impact of the COVID-19 pandemic in the United Kingdom on politics